The Ritzlihorn (3,282 m) is a mountain of the Bernese Alps, overlooking Handegg in the canton of Bern. It lies on the range east of the Gauli Glacier and north of the Bächlistock.

References

External links

 Ritzlihorn on Hikr

Bernese Alps
Mountains of the Alps
Alpine three-thousanders
Mountains of Switzerland
Mountains of the canton of Bern